Napalm is an incendiary mixture of a gelling agent and a volatile petrochemical (usually gasoline (petrol) or diesel fuel). The name is a portmanteau of two of the constituents of the original thickening and gelling agents: coprecipitated aluminium salts of naphthenic acid and palmitic acid. Napalm B is the more modern version of napalm (utilizing polystyrene derivatives) and, although distinctly different in its chemical composition, is often referred to simply as "napalm". A team led by chemist Louis Fieser originally developed napalm for the US Chemical Warfare Service in 1942 in a secret laboratory at Harvard University. Of immediate first interest was its viability as an incendiary device to be used in fire bombing campaigns during World War II; its potential to be coherently projected into a solid stream that would carry for distance (instead of the bloomy fireball of pure gasoline) resulted in widespread adoption in infantry flamethrowers as well.

In addition, it burns longer than gasoline, is more easily dispersed, and sticks to its targets. These traits make it effective and controversial. It has been widely deployed from the air and from the ground, the largest use being via airdropped bombs in World War II in the incendiary attacks on Japanese cities in 1945. It was used also for close air support roles in Korea and Vietnam. Napalm also has fueled most of the flamethrowers (tank-, ship-, and infantry-based) used since World War II, giving them much greater range, and was a common weapon of urban combat by both the Axis and the Allies in World War II.

Forms 
Napalm was used in flamethrowers, bombs, and tanks in World War II. It is believed to have been formulated to burn at a specific rate and to adhere to surfaces to increase its stopping power. During combustion, napalm rapidly deoxygenates the available air and generates large amounts of carbon monoxide and carbon dioxide.

Alternative compositions exist for different types of uses, e.g., triethylaluminium, a pyrophoric compound that aids ignition.

Development 
Use of fire in warfare has a long history. Greek fire, also described as "sticky fire" (pýr kolletikón), is believed to have had a petroleum base. The development of napalm was precipitated by the use of jellied gasoline mixtures by the Allied forces during World War II. The use of aluminium salts of organic acids (Ionov's salt) for the preparation of incendiary viscous mixtures was already done by the Soviets in 1939, with high acceptance by the Red Army. Latex, used in these early forms of incendiary devices, became scarce, since natural rubber was almost impossible to obtain after the Japanese army captured the rubber plantations in Malaya, Indonesia, Vietnam, and Thailand.

This shortage of natural rubber prompted chemists at US companies such as DuPont and Standard Oil, and researchers at Harvard University, to develop factory-made alternatives—artificial rubber for all uses, including vehicle tires, tank tracks, gaskets, hoses, medical supplies, and rain clothing. A team of chemists led by Louis Fieser at Harvard University was the first to develop synthetic napalm during 1942. "The production of napalm was first entrusted to Nuodex Products, and by the middle of April 1942 they had developed a brown, dry powder that was not sticky by itself, but when mixed with gasoline turned into an extremely sticky and flammable substance." One of Fieser's colleagues suggested adding phosphorus to the mix which increased the "ability to penetrate deeply [...] into the musculature, where it would continue to burn day after day."

On 4 July 1942, the first test occurred on the football field near the Harvard Business School. Tests under operational conditions were carried out at Jefferson Proving Ground on condemned farm buildings and subsequently at Dugway Proving Ground on buildings designed and constructed to represent those to be found in German and Japanese towns. This new mixture of chemicals was widely used by the United States in the Second World War for incendiary bombs and in flamethrowers, after its first deployment in Papua  New Guinea on 15 December 1943.

From 1965 to 1969, the Dow Chemical Company manufactured napalm B for the American armed forces. After news reports of napalm B's deadly and disfiguring effects were published, Dow Chemical experienced boycotts of its products, and its recruiters for new chemists, chemical engineers, etc., graduating from college were subject to campus boycotts and protests. The management of the company decided that its "first obligation was the government". Meanwhile, napalm B became a symbol for the Vietnam War.

Military use 

Napalm was first employed in incendiary bombs and went on to be used as fuel for flamethrowers.

The first recorded strategic use of napalm incendiary bombs occurred in an attack by the US Army Air Force (USAAF) on Berlin on 6 March 1944, using American AN-M76 incendiary bombs with PT-1 (Pyrogel) filler. The first known tactical use by the USAAF was by the 368th Fighter Group, Ninth Air Force Northeast of Compiègne, France 27 May 1944 and the British De Havilland Mosquito FB Mk.VIs of No. 140 Wing RAF, Second Tactical Air Force on 14 July 1944, which also employed the AN-M76 incendiary in a reprisal attack on the 17th SS Panzergrenadier Division "Götz von Berlichingen" in Bonneuil-Matours. Soldiers of this Waffen SS unit had captured and then killed a British SAS prisoner-of-war, Lieutenant Tomos Stephens, taking part in Operation Bulbasket, and seven local French resistance fighters. Although it was not known at the time of the airstrike, 31 other POWs from the same SAS unit, and an American airman who had joined up with the SAS unit, had also been executed.

Further use of napalm by Allied forces occurred in the Pacific theater of operations, where, in 1944 and 1945, napalm was used as a tactical weapon against Japanese bunkers, pillboxes, tunnels, and other fortifications, especially on Saipan, Iwo Jima, the Philippines, and Okinawa, where deeply dug-in Japanese troops refused to surrender. Napalm bombs were dropped by aviators of the US Navy, the USAAF, the US Marine Corps, and the Royal Air Force in support of ground troops. The M69 incendiary was specifically designed to destroy Japanese civilian houses. Those bombs were widely used against civilians, including the Bombing of Tokyo. Over 40,000 tons of AN-M69s were dropped on Japanese cities during the war.

When the USAAFs on the Marianas Islands ran out of conventional thermite incendiary bombs for their B-29 Superfortresses to drop on large Japanese cities, its top commanders, such as General Curtis LeMay, used napalm bombs to continue with fire raids.

In the European Theater of Operations, napalm was used by American forces in the siege of La Rochelle in April 1945 against German soldiers (and inadvertently French civilians) in Royan—about two weeks before the end of the war.

In its first known post-WWII use, US-supplied napalm was used in the Greek Civil War by the Greek National Army as part of Operation Coronis against the Democratic Army of Greece (DSE)—the military branch of the Communist Party of Greece (KKE).

Napalm was also widely used by the US during the Korean War. The ground forces in North Korea holding defensive positions were often outnumbered by Chinese and North Koreans, but US Air Force and Navy aviators had control of the air over nearly all of the Korean Peninsula. Hence, the American and other UN aviators used napalm B for close air support of the ground troops along the border between North Korea and South Korea and also for attacks in North Korea. Napalm was used most notably during the battle "Outpost Harry" in South Korea during the night of 10–11 June 1953. The New York Herald Tribune hailed "Napalm, the No. 1 Weapon in Korea". British Prime Minister Winston Churchill privately criticized the use of napalm in Korea, writing that it was "very cruel", as US/UN forces, he wrote, were "splashing it all over the civilian population", "tortur[ing] great masses of people". He conveyed these sentiments to U.S. Chairman of the Joint Chiefs of Staff Omar Bradley, who "never published the statement". Publicly, Churchill allowed Bradley "to issue a statement that confirmed U.K. support for U.S. napalm attacks".

At the same time, the French Air Force regularly used napalm for close air support of ground operations in the First Indochina War (1946–1954). At first, the canisters were simply pushed out the side doors of Ju-52 planes that had been captured in Germany, later mostly B-26 bombers were used.

Napalm became an intrinsic element of US military action during the Vietnam War as forces made increasing use of it for its tactical and psychological effects. The US Air Force and US Navy used napalm with great effect against all kinds of targets, such as troops, tanks, buildings, jungles, and even railroad tunnels. The effect was not always purely physical as napalm had psychological effects on the enemy as well.

A variant of napalm was produced in Rhodesia for a type of ordnance known as Frantan between 1968 and 1978 and was deployed extensively by the Rhodesian Air Force during the Bush War. In May 1978, Herbert Ushewokunze, minister of health for the Zimbabwe African National Union (ZANU), produced photographic evidence of civilian victims of Rhodesian napalm strikes, which he circulated during a tour of the US. The government of Mozambique and the Zimbabwe African People's Union (ZAPU) also issued claims at around the same time that napalm strikes against guerrilla targets had become a common feature in Rhodesian military operations both at home and abroad.

The South African Air Force frequently deployed napalm from Atlas Impala strike aircraft during raids on guerrilla bases in Angola during the South African Border War.

Other instances of napalm's use include: France during the Algerian War (1954–1962); the Portuguese Colonial War (1961–1974); Turkey (1964) dropped napalm bombs in the Republic of Cyprus; the Six-Day War by Israel (1967); in Nigeria (1969); in India and Pakistan (1965 and 1971); Egypt (1973); by Turkey (1974) the Turkish Invasion of Cyprus; by Morocco during the Western Sahara War (1975–1991); by Argentina (1982); by Iran (1980–88); by Iraq (1980–88, 1991); by Indian Peace Keeping Force (IPKF) in 1987 against Tamils (LTTE) in Sri Lanka; by Angola during the Angolan Civil War; and Yugoslavia (1991–1996). In 2018, Turkey was accused of using napalm in its war against Kurdish militias over Afrin.

Antipersonnel effects 

When used as a part of an incendiary weapon, napalm can cause severe burns (ranging from superficial to subdermal), asphyxiation, unconsciousness, and death.

Napalm is effective against dug-in enemy personnel. The burning incendiary composition flows into foxholes, tunnels, and bunkers, and drainage and irrigation ditches and other improvised troop shelters. Even people in undamaged shelters can be killed by hyperthermia, radiant heat, dehydration, asphyxiation, smoke exposure, or carbon monoxide poisoning.

International law 
International law does not specifically prohibit the use of napalm or other incendiaries against military targets, but use against civilian populations was banned by the UN Convention on Certain Conventional Weapons (CCW) in 1980. Protocol III of the CCW restricts the use of all incendiary weapons, but a number of countries have not acceded to all of the protocols of the CCW. According to the Stockholm International Peace Research Institute (SIPRI), countries are considered a party to the convention, which entered into force as international law in December 1983, as long as they ratify at least two of the five protocols. Approximately 25 years after the General Assembly adopted it, it was reported that the US signed it on 21 January 2009, President Barack Obama's first full day in office. Its ratification, however, is subject to a reservation that says that the treaty can be ignored if it would save civilian lives. The UN has also acknowledged that the US had ratified the CCW in March 1995, 13 years after the country became a signatory to it.

See also 

 Early thermal weapons
 Flame fougasse
 German Village (Dugway proving ground)
 Greek fire, an ancient flamethrowing weapon that may have resembled napalm
 Japanese Village (Dugway Proving Ground)
 M-69 Incendiary cluster bomb
 Mark 77 bomb
 Molotov cocktail
 Phan Thi Kim Phuc, a Vietnamese child injured by a napalm attack
 Triethylaluminium
 White phosphorus munitions
 F.R.A.S. (weapon)
 M4 flame fuel thickening compound

References

Further reading
 Neer, Robert M. (2013). Napalm: An American Biography. Belknap Press

External links 

 

Incendiary weapons
World War II weapons
American inventions
Soaps